Zarkam (also Romanized as Zarkām; also known as Zar Kalām) is a village in Kasma Rural District, in the Central District of Sowme'eh Sara County, Gilan Province, Iran. In the 2006 census, its population was 585, out of 162 families.

References 

Populated places in Sowme'eh Sara County